Daphne Major is a volcanic island just north of Santa Cruz Island and just west of the Baltra Airport in the Archipelago of Colón, commonly known as the Galápagos Islands.

Though easily accessible to most visitors to the Galápagos, the national park service has highly restricted visits to this island, and it is primarily used for scientific research. An intensive study of Darwin's finches was conducted here by biologists Peter and Rosemary Grant over a period of 20 years. They examined the behaviour and life cycles of finches, demonstrating the role of natural selection in producing biological evolution. Their efforts were documented in the Pulitzer Prize–winning book The Beak of the Finch.

Daphne is home to a variety of other birds including Galápagos martins, blue-footed booby, Nazca booby, short-eared owls, red-billed tropicbirds and magnificent frigatebirds.

References

B. Rosemary Grant and Peter R. Grant. 1989. Evolutionary dynamics of a natural population: the large cactus finch of the Galápagos. Chicago
Peter R. Grant. 1999. Ecology and evolution of Darwin's finches. Princeton NJ.
Peter R. Grant and B. Rosemary Grant. 1992. Demography and the genetically effective sizes of two populations of Darwin's finches. Ecology 73(3): 766–784.
Jonathan Weiner. 1994. The Beak of the Finch: A Story of Evolution in Our Time. New York: Alfred A. Knopf, Inc. .
Drought and the Demography of Darwin's Medium Ground Finches on Isla Daphne Island, Wendy E. Sera, Baylor University. Accessed 2007-04-21.

External links

Daphne Island Information

Volcanoes of the Galápagos Islands
Islands of the Galápagos Islands